Seiter is a surname. Notable people with the surname include:

Daniel Seiter (c.1642/1647–1705), Italian painter
Jimmi Seiter (born 1945), American musician, producer and manager
John Seiter (born 1944), American musician
William A. Seiter (1890–1964), American film director